Willard A. Hoagland (1862 – October 11, 1936) was a professional baseball player, manager and umpire. He was also a racewalker and a prizefighter.

Hoagland also played minor league baseball in the Empire State League in 1906. In 1908, he was described in a news article as owner and manager of the Auburn club in that league for two years.

He umpired in the Northwestern League in 1891 and 1892, and the South Atlantic League in 1910 and 1911.

Outside of baseball, Hoagland was also a racewalker and a prizefighter. In 1908, Hoagland was described as "long distance walking champion of America."

Later life
Hoagland was a game protector in Cayuga County, New York for several years.

References

1862 births
1936 deaths
Major League Baseball umpires
Sportspeople from New York (state)
19th-century baseball umpires